The Gas House Kids "in Hollywood" is a 1947 American comedy, horror, science fiction, crime film directed by Edward Cahn and starring Carl "Alfalfa" Switzer, Benny Bartlett, Rudy Wissler and Tommy Bond. It was the third and last in the series of Gas House Kids films, about a group of unruly boys from New York City with Producers Releasing Corporation shutting down in 1947.

Cast
 Carl "Alfalfa" Switzer as Alfalfa 
 Benny Bartlett as Orvie 
 Rudy Wissler as Scat 
 Tommy Bond as Chimp 
 James Burke as Police Lt. Mack 
 Jan Bryant as Hazel Crawford 
 Michael Whalen as Lance Carter 
 Douglas Fowley as Mitch Gordon 
 Frank Orth as Police Captain 
 Lyle Latell as Carter's Henchman 
 Milton Parsons as Prof. Gately Crawford 
 Kenneth Ferrill as Garry Edwards, Hazel's Boyfriend
Uncredited 
 Gene Roth as Policeman
 William Bailey as Director

References

Bibliography
 The American Film Institute Catalog of Motion Pictures Produced in the United States: Feature Films, 1941 - 1950: Feature Films. University of California Press, 1999.

External links
 

1947 films
American black-and-white films
1940s crime comedy films
1940s English-language films
Films directed by Edward L. Cahn
Producers Releasing Corporation films
Films set in Los Angeles
American crime comedy films
1947 comedy films
1940s American films